True Love is the tenth studio album by American country music singer Crystal Gayle. Released in November 1982, it peaked at #14 on the Billboard Country Albums charts.

Three of the album's tracks reached #1 on the Country Singles chart; "'Til I Gain Control Again", "Our Love is on the Faultline" and "Baby What About You".

The oft-covered track "Everything I Own" was released as a single in the UK where it peaked at #93 on the UK Singles Chart in early 1983. The song was originally recorded by the band Bread in 1972, and also was a UK #1 hit for Ken Boothe in 1974. In 1987, four years after Gayle's version, the song was recorded by Boy George (his first solo recording) who also had a UK #1 hit with it.

Track listing

US edition

UK edition

Personnel
 Charles Cochran - arranger
 Al DeLory - arranger
 David Hungate - bass
 Tom Robb - bass
 Tommy Cogbill - bass
 James Stroud - drums
 Gene Chrisman - drums
 Bruce Dees - guitar
 John Goin - guitar 
 Reggie Young - guitar
 Charles Cochran - keyboards 
 Bobby Wood - piano 
 Kathy Burdick - harmony vocals
 Sherilyn Huffman - harmony vocals
 Paul Davis - harmony vocals
 Rodney Crowell - harmony vocals
 Bill Lamb - harmony vocals
 Roger Cook - harmony vocals
 Donna Sheridan - harmony vocals
 Hurshel Wiginton - harmony vocals
 Judy Rodman - harmony vocals
 Louis Nunley - harmony vocals
 Chris Leuzinger - lead guitar
 Nashville String Machine - strings
 Shane Keister - synthesizer
 Crystal Gayle - vocals

Chart performance

References

Crystal Gayle albums
1982 albums
Albums produced by Jimmy Bowen
Albums produced by Allen Reynolds
Elektra Records albums